The Oklahoma Department of Human Services (OKDHS) is an agency of the government of Oklahoma. Under the supervision of the Oklahoma Secretary of Health and Human Services, OKDHS is responsible for providing help to individuals and families in need through public assistance programs and managing services for seniors and people with disabilities.

The department is led by the Director of Human Services, who is appointed by the Governor of Oklahoma, with the consent of the Oklahoma Senate, to serve at the pleasure of the governor. The current director is Justin Brown, who was appointed by Governor Kevin Stitt on June 17, 2019.

The department was established in 1936 during the term of Governor of Oklahoma E. W. Marland.

History
The state agency was established in 1936 by the voters of Oklahoma by an amendment to the Oklahoma Constitution. By a two-to-one margin, voters approved Article XXV, a state constitutional amendment, “to provide … for the relief and care of needy aged … and other needy persons.“ The Department was established under the name of the Department of Public Welfare. The agency began with the four divisions of finance, statistical, child welfare, and public assistance.

In 1951, Lloyd E. Rader was appointed director of the agency, and he turned the then poorly functioning agency into a model for other states. During the 1950s, the agency's responsibilities were expanded as other agencies were transferred under Rader's leadership. Rader would serve as the agency's director until his resignation in 1982.

Lawmakers changed the agency's name to the Department of Institutions, Social and Rehabilitative Services in 1968 legislation. In 1980, the Oklahoma Legislature changed the name to the Department of Human Services. Under Rader's leadership, the agency gained a large budget with the addition of federal funding. By 1966, the agency budget was $235 million. By 1970, it paid out more in welfare than any of its neighboring states.

In November 2012, Oklahoma voters amended the Oklahoma Constitution by passing State Question 756, which reorganized the agency. Prior to the amendment, the Department of Human Services was governed by a nine-member Commission on Human Services, whose members were appointed by the Governor of Oklahoma to serve fixed terms. The commission would then appoint a director under the commission's oversight. The 2012 amendment abolished the commission and provided for the appointment of the director by the governor directly.

Scope and goals
The Department of Human Services provides a number of assistance programs to help Oklahomans by administering federal programs for food benefits and Temporary Assistance for Needy Families; and the state's child welfare, developmental disabilities, aging, adult protective, and child support systems; and child care assistance, licensing and monitoring. The agency also handles applications and eligibility for ABD Sooner Care, the state's Medicaid program offering health care to aged, blind, or disabled individuals with low incomes.

Organization
The growth of the Department of Human Services has created a complex organization that includes agency leaders, division directors and county offices in each of Oklahoma's 77 counties.

Leadership
The state agency is led by the Oklahoma Secretary of Health and Human Services and day-to-day operations are administered by an agency director. Under Governor of Oklahoma Kevin Stitt, the Secretary is Justin Brown, and Justin Brown is also serving as agency Director.

Structure
As of January 2023, the organization of the Department is as follows:

Oklahoma Secretary of Human Services
Director
Chief of Staff
Financial Resources
Human Resources
Support Services
Policy and Planning
Communications
Office of Civil Rights
Office of the General Counsel
Adult and Family Services
Child Care Subsidy
Food Distribution
Low-Income Home Energy Assistance Program
State Supplementation Program
SoonerCare
Supplemental Nutrition Assistance Program
Temporary Assistance to Needy Families
Child Care Services
Child Support Services
Child Welfare Services
Family Centered Services
Child Protective Services
Foster Care Services
Adoption Services
Community Living Services
ADvantage Services
Adult Protective Services
Developmental Disability Services
Office of the Inspector General
Office of Client Advocacy

Budget and staffing
The Department of Human Services is the third largest state agency by annual appropriation. Expenditures made by the agency are divided into two major areas: an annual operating budget used to run the Department and funded primarily by state appropriations and a Medical and Assistance Fund used to fund the assistance programs. The agency receives both federal and state funding and has additional sources of revenue. The agency received a state appropriation of $587 million and had a total budget of $2.3 billion for fiscal year 2013.

The Department of Human Services is the largest employer in Oklahoma state government. As of February 2012, the staffing is as follows:

See also
 Oklahoma Health Care Authority
 Government of Oklahoma
 Kelsey Smith-Briggs Child Protection Reform Act
 "Throwaway Kids", a two-part investigative report on the OKDHS that aired on the ABC News magazine 20/20 in 1981

References

External links
Oklahoma Department of Human Services official website

Human Services, Department of
1936 establishments in Oklahoma
Government agencies established in 1936